Cevanne Horrocks-Hopayian is a British composer, singer, and harper. She is considered one of today's leading emerging composers.

Biography 
Born in Suffolk, England and of British/Armenian descent, she trained in composition at Junior Guildhall School of Music and Drama, before gaining a first in Music from Girton College, Cambridge, where she was awarded the Rima Alamuddin Composition Prize in 2004, the Turle Scholarship for Music in 2006, and the Gamble Prize for Research in 2006. She held a scholarship at Trinity College Of Music in London in 2006–07.

Career 

Horrocks-Hopayian began working with the London Symphony Orchestra in 2010–11, as a participant in their Panufnik Scheme.
She wrote for the London Symphony Orchestra Community Choir in 2017. The London Symphony Orchestra also commissioned her to arrange a traditional Gamelan piece, 'Ngedas Lemah', for première at the Barbican Centre with the London Symphony Orchestra Community Gamelan and London Symphony Orchestra Strings.
She is a London Symphony Orchestra Soundhub Associate and has broadcast for their show on Resonance FM.

Residencies

She became Visiting Fellow Commoner at Girton College in 2020.

She was inaugural composer-in-residence for the London Symphony Orchestra at Khadambi Asalache's House, 575 Wandsworth Road from 2015 to 2017.
Horrocks-Hopayian's work has a strong visual and tactile element, which she calls "Eye Music", structuring rather than simply decorating her music.

Horrocks-Hopayian was composer-in-residence at Handel House Museum from 2012 to 2014.  In February 2016, she launched Handel House Museum's opening of Jimi Hendrix's flat to the public by performing original material in collaboration with Jessica Hynes, bassist Calum Gourlay, guitarist Christopher Montague and artist Maya Ramsay.

Awards
Sound and Music (formerly spnm) awarded her their artistic director (then Kuljit Bhamra) Project: 'Bhangra Latina', in 2007.

An Arts Council England Award enabled her to record her first (experimental pop) album, 'Big Ears', which was inspired by her experience of partial deafness. She won another Arts Council England Award for her oratorio, The Evolution of Eve. (2012)

In 2013 she gained a PRS award for Consortium5's commission L'envoi, commemorating the death of suffragette Emily Wilding Davison.

The Evolution of Eve was developed in 2013 with Sveriges Radio into a broadcast, 'DJ Helga', aimed at young people,. It reached the last five at the international Prix Marulić, hosted by Croatian Radiotelevision in 2015.

In 2015, Horrocks-Hopayian was commissioned to write 'Ser Սեր (Love)' for the London Jazz Festival, performed by herself alongside guitarist Christopher Montague. She developed the piece for SATB choir in 2017, which won a BASCA call for works by BAME composers. It was premièred by the BBC Singers, and recorded for BBC Radio 3.

Trish Clowes commissioned Horrocks-Hopayian to write 'Muted Lines' for her project "My Iris" in 2016. 
"Muted Lines" won the BASCA British Composer Award in 2017.

In 2018, Melodia Women's Choir of New York City commissioned Red Bird, sharing the story of Zitkala-Sa, for its Women Composers' Commissioning Award, with world premiere performances in New York City.

Nominations
She was finalist for two BASCA British Composer Awards in 2017: "Muted Lines" was nominated for the Jazz Composition category, and "Khadambi's House" was nominated for the Chamber Ensemble category.

She was finalist, with Hugh Jones, as Crewdson, in the BASCA British Composer Awards in 2018 in the Sonic Art category for "Two Machines". This featured a new musical instrument developed by Horrocks-Hopayian and Crewdson, called the 'sonic bonnet', through which she can trigger sounds. Cevanne was featured in the New Music event at the BBC Proms 2019 with the Sonic Bonnet and her harp.

Selected works

Chamber ensemble 
  Khadambi's House (2017) for soprano, sinfonietta and tape (LSO commission) – BASCA British Composer Award 2017 finalist
  Bird Dance (2017) for soprano and sinfonietta
  The Ladies (2017) for soprano and sinfonietta
  Cave Painting I & II (2015–17) for violin and viola
  Muted Lines (2017) for alto voice, tenor sax, organ, bass, drums and sinfonietta –  British Composer Award winner 2017
  Ser Սեր (Love) (2015) for jazz quartet
  23 Brook Street (Jimi's Walls) (2015–2016) for guitar, harp, bass
  The Extra Room (2015–2016) for alto voice, guitar, harp, bass
  Petrified (2016–2017) for alto voice, guitar, harp, bass
  L'Envoi (2013) for consort recorders
  Ombre Spezzate (2013) for jazz ensemble
  How is a World like a Window (2012) for two violins, cello, bass clarinet & hang
  Turquoise Trail (2012) for harp & strings
  Dark Garden (2008) for voice, trumpet, piano, bass, congas, tabla, timbales
  Hunting Bow (Home is where the harp is) (2011) for harp ensemble (clarsach, kora, krar)
  If I could say (2010) for lever harps (BBC Radio 3 commission)
  Round 4 (2014) for violin and cello
  When I Return (2014) for viol da gamba and optional voice
  Jumpy One (2013 -) for jazz ensemble

Orchestra 
  Ngedas Lemah (trad. arrangement) (2017) for string orchestra (LSO commission)
  Love Like Salt (Amor Como Sal) (2016) for youth orchestra and electronics 
  A Dancing Place (2010) for symphony orchestra
  Record (2008) for orchestra and electronics

Vocal 
  The Swallow (2017) for soprano & string quartet'''
  Inkwells (2016–2017) for voice & tape
  House Music (2014) for soprano & keyboard
  'A Brief Description of the Excellent Virtues of that Sober and Wholesome Drink, called Coffee' (2014) for voice & accompaniment 
  Sari Siroon Yar (trad. arrangement) (2012) for voice and strings
  From The Unseen World (2014) for voice and strings
  Stars & Stars (stjärnor och stjärnor) (2012–2013) voice, chorus, hang, harp, cello
  Lilith (2012–2013) voice, harp, hang, cello
  Don't Fret (2012) voice, accompaniment
  The Nature of Spirit (2012) voice, cello
  Turing Believes Machines Think (2012) voice, cello
  Time and the Crocodile (2010) voice and band with drum kit
  Clever Girl (2010) voice and band with drum kit
  Ad Break Tamzara (2010) chamber
  Shadow (2009–2010) voice and band with drum kit
  DS (2006–2007) voice with accompaniment (original: clarinet, vibraphone, harpsichord)
  We're Watching You (2009–2010) voice and band with drum kit
  Big Ears (2010) voice, piano, harp, cello, drum kit, tabla
  Moving Country (2007) voice & accompaniment – text by Choman Hardi

Choral 
  Red Bird (2018) for SSAA and string quartet
  Ser Սեր (Love) (2017) for SATB a cappella
  The Fence-Sitter (2017) for amateur SATB and brass quintet (LSO commission)
  Round 3 (2017) for multiple voices
  Cave Painter (2015) for SATB and string quartet
  Vocal Shore (2009) for SATB and trumpet
  City Tree (2007) for SATB a cappella

Electronics 
  Two Machines (2018), for voice and found sounds
  Walls & Ways (2016–2017) for clarinet and tape
  Two Sisters (2016–2017) for voice and electronics
  Sisa's Well (2013–2017) for voice, harp and found sounds
  They Forgot (2017) for voice, harp and found sounds
  OMG (2007) for voice and found sounds
  3 M'Lord (2006)

Theatre 
  DJ Helga (2013) voices, hang, harp, cello for Sveriges Radio Drama – Prix Marulic, Croatian Radiotelevision (HRT) 2015 finalist
  The Evolution of Eve Oratorio (2012) sop & alto voice, hang, harp, cello, xylosynth, electronics, chorus
  The King-napped King (2015) narrator, alto, harp, piano
  The Firebird and other Russian Tales (2011) narrator, soprano, harp, piano
  Women of Trachis, Sophocles, (2005), Khorus, violin, saxophone, piano
  Past/Future/Fracture (2008) ensemble and electronics for dance

Dance 
  Seasons in our World (2019), Ballet with orchestra and electronics, for Birmingham Royal Ballet. Choreographed by Laura Day (Spring), Lachlan Monaghan (Summer, Autumn), Kit Holder (Winter).

Opera 
  Generation (2019), Libretto Sabrina Mahfouz, commissioned by Hera Opera Company
  FAKE OR STAKE! (2019), Royal Opera House, Linbury Theatre, Libretto, Jessica Walker
  1000 Songs (2019) Development Residency, Snape Maltings, with Libretto, Ziazan Horrocks-Hopayian; Director Seta White
  1000 Songs (2018), Scene, with chamber orchestra and electronics, for Arcola (London Grimeborn). Libretto, Ziazan Horrocks-Hopayian. First performed by Ziazan Horrocks-Hopayian (The Enchantress); Abigail Kelly Nightingale

Discography

As writer/producer and performer 
  2021 – Welcome Party – LSO, with Jon Hargreaves, conductor. Soloists: Ziazan (soprano), Cevanne Horrocks-Hopayian (voice), Trish Clowes (Tenor Saxophone), Tim Giles (drums) Ausiàs Garrigós Morant (Clarinet and bass clarinet), Choir of Girton College Cambridge (NMC)
  2020 – Panufnik Legacies III – LSO, with François-Xavier Roth, 'A Dancing Place (scherzo)' (London Symphony Orchestra Publications)
  2019 – BRACE – with Hugh Jones, as Crewdson and Cevanne, (Accidental Records). The album includes Two Machines, which was nominated for BASCA British Composer Award in Sonic Art, 2018)
  2015 – The Evolution of Eve EP – from the Sveriges Radio play DJ Helga. Performers – Manu Delago, Ziazan Horrocks-Hopayian, Gregor Riddel, Cevanne Horrocks-Hopayian (Phyllis Tweed Publications)
  2013  – Peekaboogie – written by Jessica Hynes, with Maral Mohammadi, Ziazan Horrocks-Hopayian, Ben Kelly, George Bird, Wayne Francis, Cevanne Horrocks-Hopayian (Phyllis Tweed Publications)
  2010 – Big Ears – Performers – Zoe Rahman, Kuljit Bhamra, Kareem Dayes, Maral Mohammadi, Cevanne Horrocks-Hopayian, Ziazan Horrocks-Hopayian (Phyllis Tweed Publications)

Featured 
  2017 My Iris – Trish Clowes – as composer for track 'Muted Lines' (winner of BASCA British Composer Award 2017) (Basho Records)
  2013 Fable:Time Shama Rahman – as performer (Bandcamp)
  2011 Galaxies not ghettos – United Vibrations  – as performer- (12 Tone CIC)
  2008/9 Bhangra Latina – Kuljit Bhamra, Alex Wilson track 'Dark Garden' – as composer & performer (KEDA Records)

References

External links

BBC Radio 4 Last Word (19 January 2014)
DJ Helga, Radio Sweden, developed from The Evolution of Eve, sverigesradio.se

Year of birth missing (living people)
Alumni of Girton College, Cambridge
Alumni of the Guildhall School of Music and Drama
Alumni of Trinity College of Music
British classical composers
British women classical composers
British people of Armenian descent
Deaf classical musicians
Living people
Musicians from Suffolk
English deaf people
Women in classical music
Women opera composers
British opera composers